Chinese Poetry Congress is an ongoing game show on China Central Television that tests competitors' memory and reciting of Chinese poetry, including classical and modern forms of shi, ci and qu. It is related to several other game shows such as Chinese Characters Dictation Competition and Chinese Idioms Congress.

Opening poetry
Every episode of the show starts with quotations from a piece of classical Chinese poetry. In the first season ten pieces were quoted. Note: the following pinyin tones show original, or standard pronunciation, not including tone sandhis on special syllables.

In the second season, the off-stage contestants no longer read poems, and the presenter of the show read instead.

Gameplay
The show follows a two-part game. In the first part, there are 105 contestants competing, 5 that have done best in the previous episode on stage and 100 off stage (called "百人团", lit. hundred people team). The ones on stage select their set of ten questions one by one, and answer them in order. Off-stage contestants answers simultaneously on iPads. If they answer correctly in 10 seconds, the number of other participants that answers incorrectly adds to their score, otherwise their game is over. When a contestant's score surpasses another's, the latter is eliminated.

The second part sees the best of the five challenging the contestant that has done best during the season, and they have to answer a series of more tough questions in order to win the challenge. One such segment is the fei hua ling (飞花令, lit. "flying flower game"), a section where the two contestants must constantly think of and recite verses that contain a particular character or reference a particular theme. The intensity of this section has contributed to the show's popularity.

The second season introduces a more "reasonable" gameplay: every episode four contestants are selected from the hundred-contestants team, and follow part one from the first season; then the best of them has to challenge the fastest and most correct off-stage contestant to decide who would be the best of the episode, and may accept challenge from people that competes later. The first four contestants (in the opening episode) were chosen as the best performers of a non-broadcast written test and subsequent auditions.

In the fourth season, the questions are related to a certain keyword. If a contestant answers a question wrong, he or she is given a 'redemption' opportunity through succeeding any of 3 challenges: completing a game of fei hua ling against 12 other participants from the entire off-stage participant panel, answering guessing game-style questions about poetry, or managing to recite one verse relating every of 12 given themes. The challenge for the contestant is chosen randomly. This opportunity is not presented on the second incorrect answer.

Question format

Round 1
The first round contains nine questions:
Identify the line. Choose the correct characters from 9 or 12 characters to form a line of a poem.
Missing character/line. Fill in the missing character or complete the missing line.
Multiple choice.

Round 2
Each of the two contestants must alternatively give two poem lines, containing a chosen character. The game ends when one of the two contestants cannot name another sentence.

Championship Round
Winner of Round 2 and the returning champion play a best-of-nine final, all the questions are on the buzzer. The first 3 questions are related to drawings, where contestants are required to identify a line related to the paintting. The next 6 questions are guessing questions related to four cues. 1 point will be given for each correct answer, and for each wrong answer, the opponent score. First to score 5 points will be determined as the champion, and return for the next episode.

Cast

Presenter
The presenter of Chinese Poetry Congress is Dong Qing, known for co-hosting CCTV New Year's Gala for years. She serves as both a host and a narrator. During a re-recording, Dong, by accident, fell off the stage and hurt her kneecap; however she insisted to continue recording under a cold compression, and eventually completed the show. Dong also performed reciting a poem in Shanghainese, singing Su Shi's Shui diao ge tou, and quoting numerous Chinese idioms on air.

Judges
 Li Bo is a Nanjing Normal University literature professor, having been giving lessons at CCTV's Lecture Room, a program on which scholars share their works and make statements of various subjects. Li was also a judge on Chinese Idioms Congress.
 Meng Man is a master-advisor of Minzu University of China, working on ancient Chinese women. Meng was also a lecturer on Lecture Room and a judge on Chinese Idioms Congress.
 Wang Liqun is a Henan University professor and Doctor-advisor and a pioneer on studying ancient Chinese literature and culture.
 Kang Zhen is a Beijing Normal University professor and Doctor-advisor.

The Hundred Contestants Team
The people that answer questions off-stage are from all walks of life such as teachers, students, peasants and the police, not restricted to Chinese residents. The age ranges from 7 to 55. They follow the narrator's reciting opening poetry and count to the points that an on-stage contestant gets if their answer is incorrect. Due to the limited time of 10 seconds to answer on a tablet computer, a large quantity of contestants failed to complete verses that are usually taught in China's primary schools, for example Meng Haoran's Ode to the Willow, leading to criticism on the team, as they were described as "The regular studio audience".

In the fourth season, the team is divided into four groups: children, teenage students, workingpeople from various employments, and duos (formed from friends, family, lovers, or other close relations).

Awards
In the 22nd Shanghai Television Festival, Chinese Poetry Congress is awarded the best variety show.

References
All references are in Simplified Chinese except as otherwise stated.

China Central Television
Mandarin-language television shows
Chinese game shows
Language competitions
2010s Chinese television series